Radio Iodine was an American alternative rock band from St. Louis, Missouri, United States. It was formed in 1993 as 9 Days Wonder by Tony Persyn, his wife Ellen and drummer Steven “Stitch” Held.  After another band threatened to sue over the name, the band changed its name to Radio Iodine. It signed to Radioactive Records, which released a self-titled EP in 1996. Radioactive Records chairman Gary Kurfirst moved the band to his new subsidiary label Radiouniverse, and the band's 1997 album Tiny Warnings was the label's inaugural release.

A midwest tour took the band through the summer of 1997. In the fall of 1997, Tom Bramer quit the band and was replaced by guitarist Mike Speckhard. The band performed its final show at Mississippi Nights in St. Louis on December 12, 1998.

Tony Persyn died on January 12, 2020.

Members
 Ellen Bledsoe - vocals
 Tom Bramer - guitars
 Mike Speckhard - guitars
 Anna DiPiazza - keyboards, backing vocals
 Tony Persyn - bass and sequencing
 Greg Miller - drums
Former member original drummer
 Steven "Stitch" Held
 Linda Gaal - backing vocals Former member

Discography

References

External links
 Radio Iodine on Last.fm

Musical groups established in 1995
Musical groups disestablished in 1998
Alternative rock groups from Missouri
Musical groups from St. Louis